Aridification is the process of a region becoming increasingly arid, or dry. It refers to long term change, rather than seasonal variation.

It is often measured as the reduction of average soil moisture content.
It can be caused by reduced precipitation, increased evaporation, lowering of water tables, and changes in ground cover acting individually or in combination.
Its major consequences include reduced agricultural production, soil degradation, ecosystem changes and decreased water catchment runoff.

Some researchers have found that the Colorado River basin and other parts of western North America are currently undergoing aridification.

See also 

 Arid
 Arid Forest Research Institute
 Desert
 Global warming
 Groundwater
 Soil moisture
 Water balance
 Water content
 Water cycle

References 

Water and the environment
Desertification